Parliamentary elections were held in Ivory Coast on 18 December 2016. The new constitution, which was approved in a referendum in October, reduced the term for the 255 members of the National Assembly from five to four years.

The presidential coalition, the Rally of Houphouëtists for Democracy and Peace (composed of the Rally of the Republicans, the Democratic Party of Ivory Coast – African Democratic Rally and some minor parties) won more than the half the seats in the National Assembly.

Electoral system
The 255 members of the National Assembly were elected from 169 single-member constituencies and 36 multi-member constituencies with between two and six seats. In single-member constituencies voters cast a vote for one candidate who is elected by first-past-the-post voting; whereas in multi-member constituencies candidates were elected by plurality-at-large voting, where voters cast a single vote for a closed list, with the list receiving the most votes winning all seats in the constituency.

Campaign
A total of 1,336 candidates contested the elections, 597 representing 38 political parties and 739 as independents. The Rally of Houphouëtists for Democracy and Peace had the most candidates (248), with the Ivorian Popular Front (which had boycotted the 2011 elections) the only other party to run candidates in more than half of constituencies, having nominated 187 candidates. Sixteen parties contested only one seat.

Results
In constituency 34 there was a tie between two candidates, with the independent candidate Léonard Guéi Desseloue  and Marius Sarr Bohe (RHDP) both receiving 1,231 votes. A second round of voting took place within 15 days. Léonard Sahé won the last constituency achieving 52.69% while Marius Sarr got 46.31%.

Aftermath
When the National Assembly began meeting for the new parliamentary term, Guillaume Soro, an RHDP deputy, was re-elected as President of the National Assembly on 9 January 2017. He received 230 votes from the 252 deputies present; Evariste Méambly, an independent deputy, received 12 votes, and there were 10 spoilt votes.

References

External links
List of candidates Independent Electoral Commission
National Results 

Ivory
2016 in Ivory Coast
Elections in Ivory Coast
December 2016 events in Africa